Zazelenchuk is a surname. Notable people with the surname include:

Jo-Ann Zazelenchuk (born 1958), Canadian politician
Lawrence Zazelenchuk, Canadian film director, screenwriter, film producer, and prosthetic makeup artist